Sir Francis Mursell Ferris (19 August 1932 – 26 March 2018) was a British High Court Judge.

Francis Ferris was the son of Francis William Ferris and Elsie Lilian May Ferris (née Mursell). He educated at Bryanston School and Oriel College, Oxford. He became a High Court Judge (Chancery Division) during 1990–2005 and was a Queen's Counsel. He was appointed as an Honorary Fellow of Oriel College, Oxford, in 2000.

Ferris was an amateur rower and the only person to be successively Captain (1957), Chairman (1971–1986), and President (1992–2007) of the Marlow Rowing Club at Marlow, Buckinghamshire on the River Thames. He became a member of the Marlow Regatta's Committee in 1963, the Management Committee in 1999, and was elected as a Vice President in 2004.

Francis Ferris married Sheila Elizabeth Hester Falloon Bedford in 1957 and had four children. He was knighted in 1990.

References

1932 births
2018 deaths
Place of birth missing
People from Marlow, Buckinghamshire
People educated at Bryanston School
Alumni of Oriel College, Oxford
Chancery Division judges
English male rowers
English King's Counsel
20th-century English judges
21st-century English judges
English knights